Marc Fleischhauer (born 8 August 1999) is a German footballer who plays as a defender for NOFV-Oberliga Süd club FC An der Fahner Höhe.

Club career
A product of the Rot-Weiß Erfurt youth system, Fleischhauer made two senior appearances for the club in the 3. Liga.  He was transferred to SV 09 Arnstadt of the NOFV-Oberliga Süd in 2020 where he played 7 matches and scored 2 goals before joining league rivals FC An der Fahner Höhe.

References

External links
 
 

1999 births
Living people
German footballers
Association football defenders
FC Rot-Weiß Erfurt players
3. Liga players
Oberliga (football) players